Oeciotypa is a genus of flies (Diptera) belonging to the family Platystomatidae.

Distribution
Species belonging to this genus are present in parts of Africa.

Species
O. disjuncta Whittington, 2003
O. hendeli Lindner, 1957
O. parallelomma Hendel, 1914
O. rotundiventris Frey, 1932
O. skaia Whittington, 2003
O. splendens Whittington, 2003

References 

Diptera of Africa
Platystomatidae